Aminabad Agriculture Complex (also Romanized as Mojtame` Keshāvarzī Āmīnābād) is a village and agriculture complex in Momenabad Rural District, in the Central District of Sarbisheh County, South Khorasan Province, Iran. At the 2006 census, its population was 94, in 32 families.

References 

Populated places in Sarbisheh County